Pseudocneorhinus is a genus of broad-nosed weevils in the beetle family Curculionidae. There are about 11 described species in Pseudocneorhinus.

Species
These 11 species belong to the genus Pseudocneorhinus:
 Pseudocneorhinus adamsi Roelofs, 1879 c g
 Pseudocneorhinus alternans Marshall, 1934 c g
 Pseudocneorhinus bifasciatus Roelofs c g b (twobanded Japanese weevil)
 Pseudocneorhinus hirsutus (Formanek, 1916) c g
 Pseudocneorhinus minimus Roelofs, 1879 c g
 Pseudocneorhinus obesus Roelofs, 1873 c g
 Pseudocneorhinus sellatus Marshall, 1934 c g
 Pseudocneorhinus setosus Roelofs, 1879 c g
 Pseudocneorhinus soheuksandoensis Han &  Yoon, 2000 c g
 Pseudocneorhinus squamosus Marshall, 1934 c g
 Pseudocneorhinus subcallosus (Voss, 1956) c g
Data sources: i = ITIS, c = Catalogue of Life, g = GBIF, b = Bugguide.net

References

Further reading

External links

 

Entiminae